Bert is a hypocoristic form of a number of various Germanic male given names, such as Robert, Albert, Elbert, Herbert, Hilbert,  Hubert, Gilbert, Wilbert, Filbert, Norbert, Osbert, Bertram, Berthold, Bertrand, Umberto, Humbert, Cuthbert, Delbert, Dagobert, Rimbert, Egbert, Siegbert, Gualbert, Gerbert, Lambert, Engelbert, Friedbert, Gombert, Calbert, Leebert and Colbert.

There is a large number of Germanic names ending in -bert, second in number only to those ending in -wolf (-olf, -ulf). Most of these names are early medieval and only a comparatively small fraction remains in modern use.

The element -berht has the meaning of   "bright",  Old English beorht/berht, Old High German beraht/bereht, ultimately from a Common Germanic *berhtaz, from a PIE root *bhereg- "white, bright". The female hypocoristic of names containing the same element is Berta.

Modern English bright itself has the same etymology, but it has suffered metathesis at an early date, already in the Old English period, attested as early as AD 700 in the Lindisfarne Gospels. The unmetastasized form disappears after AD 1000 and Middle English from about 1200 has briht universally.

Names containing berht
There is no evidence of the berht element in Germanic personal names prior to the 6th century. It is mostly unknown in names of Goths, Vandals, Frisians or Norse, and only rarely occurs in names of Saxons. By contrast, it is very common among Anglo-Saxons, Lombards, Franks and Bavarians. The popularity of the element in certain areas may be related to religion, similar to the wolf element being due to the worship of Wodanaz, the names with berht can be considered theophoric, in connection with the goddess Perchta. The full form of Old High German beraht is reduced in two ways, by omission of either the second (berht, perht, pert) or the first vowel (braht, praht, brat, prat, brecht). Early attestations of such names include Ethberictus, Garberictus, and Transberictus mentioned in Hontheim's Historia Trevirensis s. a. 699.  Pardessus' Diplomata s. a. 745 has Berdbert as a rare example of a  reduplicated Germanic name. Förstemann counts 369 names with final -bert(a), of which 61 are feminine.

Given names that remain in modern use include:

 names with -bert as final element
 Albert/Æthelberht, Cuthbert, Dagobert, Elbert, Egbert, Engelbert, Filbert, Gerbert, Gilbert, Harbert, Herbert, Hubert, Humbert, Ingbert, Isambard (Isembert), Norbert, Robert, Tolbert, Wilbert
 names with Bert- as first element
 Bertram, Berthold, Bertrand

Names abbreviated "Bert"

The following names are commonly abbreviated as "Bert":

 Albert/Adalbert (Æthelbert)
 Berthold/Bertold
 Bertrand/Bertram
 Colbert
 Gilbert
 Heribert/Herbert
 Hubert
 Lambert
 Norbert
 Robert
 Cumbert

People called Bert
Bert Abbey (1869–1962), American baseball player
Bert Acosta (1895–1954), American aviator
Bert Adams (1891–1940), American baseball player
Bert Adams (politician) (1916–2003), American politician
Bert Addinall (1921–2005), English professional footballer
Bert Anciaux (born 1959), Belgian politician and founder and former member of Spirit (later known as the Social Liberal Party, or SLP)
Bert Assirati (1908–1990), English professional wrestler
Bert Bell (1895–1959), National Football League commissioner
Bert Berns (1929–1967), American songwriter and record producer in the 1960s
Bert Blyleven (Aalbert) (born 1951), Dutch-born American baseball player
Bert Bos (Gijsbert) (born 1963), Dutch computer scientist working for W3C
Bert Brown, (1938–2018), Canadian politician
Bert Convy (Bernard) (1933–1991), American singer, actor and game show host
Bert Cunningham (1865–1952), American baseball player
Bert I. Gordon (1922–2023), American film director and screenwriter
Bert Haanstra (Albert) (1916–1997), Dutch film director
Bert Kaempfert (Bertolt) (1923–1980), German orchestra leader
Bert Koenders (Albert) (born 1958), Dutch politician
Bert Kreischer, (born 1972), American comedian
Bert Laeyendecker (1930–2020), Dutch sociologist
Bert Lahr (1895–1967), American actor and comedian
Bert McCracken (Robert) (born 1982), American lead singer of alternative band The Used
Bert van Marwijk (Lambertus) (born 1952), Dutch football player and coach
Bert Newton (Albert) (born 1938, died 2021), Australian entertainer and media personality
Bert Nievera (1936–2018), Filipino-American singer
Bert Parks (1914–1992), American actor, singer, host of Miss America from 1955 to 1979
Bert Peters (composer) (18??–19??), American composer 
Bert Peters (1908–1944), Australian rules footballer
Bert Sakmann (Bertold) (born 1942), German cell biologist, winner of the 1991 Nobel Prize for Medicine
Bert Schneider (1897–1986), Canadian Olympic champion welterweight boxer
Bert Stenfeldt (born 1933), Swedish Air Force major general
Bert Trautmann (Bernhard) (1923–2013), German football player
Bert Vaux (born 1968), American linguist
Bert Vogelstein (born 1949), American cancer researcher
Bert Weckhuysen (born 1968), Belgian chemist
Bert Wheeler (1895–1968), American comedian
Bert Williams (1874–1922), Bahamian-born American entertainer
Bert Wipiti (1922–1943), New Zealand fighter pilot

As a surname
Joris Bert (born 1987), French baseball player
Liliane Bert (1922–2015), French actress
Mabel Bert (née Mabel Scott, 1862–1???), Australian-American actress
Margaret Bert (1896–1971), British-American actress
Paul Bert (1833–1886), French physiologist

Fictional characters
Albert "Bert" Sanders, a character in the 1997 television movie On the 2nd Day of Christmas played by Mark Ruffalo
Bert (Sesame Street), a Muppet character (of Bert and Ernie) on the long-running children's television show Sesame Street
Bert Barry, a Co-writer and producer of Pretty Lady on the Broadway musical play 42nd Street
Bert Ljung, a fictional character in the Bert diaries
Bert (Mary Poppins), a Cockney chimney sweep in the book series and Disney film Mary Poppins. Played in the film by Dick Van Dyke
Bert Raccoon, a lead character in TV series The Raccoons

See also

Bart (disambiguation)
Bert (disambiguation)
Berth (disambiguation)
Birt (disambiguation)
Burt (disambiguation)

References

French-language surnames
English-language masculine given names
Dutch masculine given names
English masculine given names
Surnames from given names